Yuancun Station is  an interchange station between Line 5 and Line 21 of Guangzhou Metro, and also the terminus of Line 21. It is located under the junction of Huacheng Avenue East and Yuancun 2nd Cross Road in Tianhe District. It lies to the east of Zhujiang New Town and to the north of Pazhou, and was opened on 28December 2009.

The station has 2 underground island platforms, one for each line.

Station layout

Exits
There are 6 exits, lettered A, B, C, D, E and F. Exit A, B and E are accessible. All exits are located on Yuancun 2nd Cross Road.

Gallery

References

Railway stations in China opened in 2009
Guangzhou Metro stations in Tianhe District